Whirinaki is a small coastal settlement in Hawke's Bay, in the eastern North Island of New Zealand. It sits just north of the mouth of the Esk River, a few kilometres north of Bay View and a similar distance east of Eskdale. It lies on State Highway 2, just north of its junction with State Highway 5.

Pan Pac timber and wood pulp mill, one of Hawke's Bay's largest industrial plants, is at Whirinaki. The diesel-powered Whirinaki Power Station opened next to the mill in 1978, later closed and then reopened in 2004. Designed to be a standby power station, it has a total capacity of 155MW and is owned and operated by Contact Energy. A mountain bike park is immediately north of the mill.

Pētane Marae is in a rural area nearby. It is a meeting place for Ngāti Matepū and Ngāti Whakaari, two hapū (sub-tribes) of the Ngāti Kahungunu iwi (tribe). Te Amiki is the name of the meeting house. In October 2020, the Government committed $6,020,910 from the Provincial Growth Fund to upgrade 19 Hawke's Bay marae, including Pētane Marae. The funding was expected to create 39 jobs.

Notes

References 

Hastings District
Populated places in the Hawke's Bay Region